The cyclamen mite (Phytonemus pallidus) is a tiny mite often found as a pest on African violets and cyclamen plants. It is invisible to the naked eye, measuring only 0.02 cm (0.01 inch) at maturity. It requires a warm, humid environment, and is therefore problematic primarily in greenhouses.

References

Linquist, E. E. (1987). The World Genera of Tarsonemidae (Acarina: Heterostigmata): A morphological, phylogenetic and systematic revision with a reclassification of family-group taxa in the Heterostigmata. Memoirs Ent. Soc. Canada, (136), 517.

External links
  cyclamen mite, Phytonemus pallidus on the UF / IFAS Featured Creatures Web site

Trombidiformes
Animals described in 1901
Arachnids of Africa